Deltalipothrixvirus is a genus of viruses in the family Lipothrixviridae. Archaea acidianus serve as natural hosts. Two species are assigned to the genus.

Taxonomy
The following two species are assigned to the genus:
 Acidianus filamentous virus 2
 Deltalipothrixvirus SBFV3

Structure
Viruses in Deltalipothrixvirus are enveloped, with rod-shaped geometries. The diameter is around 24 nm, with a length of 1100 nm. Genomes are linear, around 32kb in length. The genome codes for 51 proteins.

Life cycle
Viral replication is cytoplasmic, and entry into the host cell is achieved by adsorption into the host cell. DNA templated transcription is the method of transcription. Archaea acidianus serve as the natural host. Transmission routes are through passive diffusion.

References

External links
 Viralzone: Deltalipothrixvirus
 ICTV

Virus genera
Lipothrixviridae